Events from the year 1721 in Sweden

Incumbents
 Monarch – Frederick I

Events

 15 April - A great fire in Gothenburg. 
 25 May - The Battle of Sundsvall during the Russian Pillage of 1719-1721. 
 May to June - Hudiksvall, Härnösand, Piteå, Sundsvall, Söderhamn and Umeå are burned by the Russians during the Russian Pillage of 1719-1721, but Gävle is successfully defended. 
 - September 10 – The Treaty of Nystad is signed, ending the Great Northern War.
 Den Gyldene Freden
 The first theater performance is presented at the Bollhuset for fifteen years, since the theater is opened again after the war. 
 The Maria Ersdotter case.

Births
 Catharina Elisabet Grubb, industrialist  (died 1788) 
 Fredrik Henrik af Chapman, shipbuilder, scientist and officer (died 1808)

Deaths

 Maria Ersdotter, criminal (born 1685)

References

 
Years of the 18th century in Sweden
Sweden